Araeomolis albipicta is a moth of the family Erebidae. It was described by Paul Dognin in 1909, originally under the genus Aphyle. It is found in French Guiana, Colombia and the Brazilian state of Amazonas.

References

Phaegopterina
Moths described in 1909
Moths of South America